Trinculo can refer to:
 Trinculo, a character in William Shakespeare's play The Tempest.
 Trinculo (moon), a natural satellite of Uranus.
 Trinculo, a crater on Miranda, which is also a natural satellite of Uranus.